Syntrophus is a Gram negative bacterial genus from the family of Syntrophaceae.

Phylogeny
The currently accepted taxonomy is based on the List of Prokaryotic names with Standing in Nomenclature (LPSN) and National Center for Biotechnology Information (NCBI)

See also 
 List of bacterial orders
 List of bacteria genera

References

Further reading 
 
 
 
 
 

Thermodesulfobacteriota
Bacteria genera